Janez Albreht (23 March 1925, in Ljubljana – 1 March 2013) was a Slovenian theatre actor. He was a member of SNG in Ljubljana. He worked on the radio and TV Slovenia and took main roles in the dramas of William Shakespeare and Anton Pavlovich Chekhov. He received the Prešeren Fund Award in 1981.

Selected filmography
 Idealist (1976)

References

Sources
 Slovenski veliki leksikon, Mladinska knjiga (2003)

1925 births
2013 deaths
Slovenian male stage actors
Slovenian radio personalities
Actors from Ljubljana